Todd Kenneth Strueby (born June 15, 1963) is a Canadian retired professional ice hockey centre who played most of his career in the minor leagues.

Strueby was born in Lanigan, Saskatchewan and raised in Humboldt, Saskatchewan. He played junior hockey for the Regina Pats and Saskatoon Blades of the Western Hockey League (WHL). He played for the Canada national junior hockey team at the 1982 World Junior Ice Hockey Championships, where Canada won the gold medal.

Strueby was selected in the second round of the 1981 NHL Entry Draft by the Edmonton Oilers.  He made his National Hockey League debut in the 1981–82 season, appearing in three games before returning to the Blades.  He was also called up for one game in the 1982–83 season, his last in the WHL.  Strueby turned professional for the 1983–84 season, but spent almost that entire season playing for the minor league Moncton Alpines.  His single game played for the Oilers that season would be his last in the NHL.

Strueby spent the next four seasons playing for the Nova Scotia Oilers in the American Hockey League and for the Muskegon Lumberjacks and Fort Wayne Komets of the International Hockey League.  He spent the next three seasons (1988–91) playing for the Canadian national team and for EHC Freiburg in the German ice hockey Bundesliga.  He returned to the IHL for the 1991–92 season, playing for the Salt Lake Golden Eagles, and he retired in 1993.

Career statistics

Awards
 WHL First All-Star Team – 1982
 WHL Second All-Star Team – 1983

External links

1963 births
Living people
Canadian expatriate ice hockey players in Germany
Canadian expatriate ice hockey players in the United States
Canadian ice hockey centres
EHC Freiburg players
Edmonton Oilers draft picks
Edmonton Oilers players
Fort Wayne Komets players
Ice hockey people from Saskatchewan
Moncton Alpines (AHL) players
Muskegon Lumberjacks players
Nova Scotia Oilers players
Regina Pats players
Salt Lake Golden Eagles (IHL) players
Saskatoon Blades players
Sportspeople from Humboldt, Saskatchewan